Sophie Dabo-Niang (née Dabo) is a Senegalese and French mathematician, statistician, and professor who has done outreach to increase the status of African mathematicians.

Biography

Early life
Sophie was encouraged to pursue mathematics by her parents and her teachers. She knew she wanted to study mathematics early in high school.

Education
Sophie Dabo-Niang earned her PhD in 2002 from the Pierre and Marie Curie University in Paris. Sophie enjoys passing on her passion for mathematics to her students.

Marriage and children
As of 2016, Dabo-Niang is married. She had 3 children between starting her master's degree and finishing her doctoral thesis, and has 4 children in total. She has said that balancing parenting and her mathematics career has been a challenge, and she credits her persistence to her desire to succeed and the support of her husband.

Mathematical work
Dabo-Niang has published articles on functional statistics, nonparametric and semi-parametric estimates of weakly independent processes, spatial statistics, and mathematical epidemiology.

Dabo-Niang serves as an editor of the journal Revista Colombiana de Estadística and is on the scientific committee of the Centre International de Mathématiques Pures et Appliquées (CIMPA).

Professorship and developing country outreach
Sophie Dabo-Niang has successfully supervised the doctoral theses of several students in Africa. As of January 2021 she is a full professor at the University of Lille and is supervising and co-supervising multiple African students. She has taught master's-level statistics courses, including in Senegal.

She introduced the spatial statistics subfields to a university in Dakar, Senegal, and supervised the first Senegalese and Mauritanian doctoral students focusing on the field. She often participates on thesis juries in Africa.

Dabo-Niang has coordinated scientific events in Africa. In Senegal, she coordinated a CIMPA event and an event to encourage young girls in the mathematical sciences. She serves as the chair of the Developing Countries Committee for the European Mathematical Society.

Selected publications

Books

Articles

Honours, decorations, awards and distinctions
The African Women in Mathematics Association has profiled Dabo-Niang. She was honored by Femmes et Mathématiques in 2015.

See also
Female education in STEM

References

External links 

 personal website
 podcast recording of her workshop on "Functional estimation in high dimensional data : Application to classification" 
 

Living people
Senegalese statisticians
Senegalese mathematicians
Senegalese people
Women mathematicians
Women statisticians
African mathematicians
French mathematicians
French women mathematicians
Year of birth missing (living people)